Khothanwali is a village in Hanumangarh district of Rajasthan, India. It belongs to Bikaner division. It is 48 km west of Hanumangarh. Suratgarh is the nearest railway station. It is 3 km from National Highway NH-62 (15)and 440 km from state capital Jaipur. In 2008 awarded the Nirmal Gram.

Education
The village has two government Higher School separately for boys and girls, one co-education school, one Middle and one secondary school. There are a number of non Government Middle and Secondary Schools.

 Govt. Sr. Secondary School
 Balaji Higher Primary School
 Swami vivekanand Higher Primary School

Hospitals
 Govt. deputy Health Centre

Chemists and Laboratories
More than a dozone Chemists and 1 Laboratories fulfills primary medical needs for the village

Language
Bagri is the major language in Hanumangarh. It is also known as Khichdi language because of having Punjabi words and a Haryanvi accent. Punjabi language is also used as a second language of area and as the predominant language in northern areas along the border of Punjab. Hindi is the state language and English is also used among officials and children.

Climate
The climate of Khothanwali varies to extreme limits. Summer temperature can reach 50° degrees Celsius and winter temperature dips just around 0° Celsius. The average annual rainfall is only 200 mm (7.9 in). Average maximum temperature in summer is around 41.2 °C and average minimum temperature in winter is around 6 °C.

Economy
The economy of the Village is based on grain market & agriculture, its main crops are wheat, mustard and cotton. Other crops are guar, bajra, sugar cane and grams. In recent years, farmers are also diverting towards horticulture. Kinnow(a citrus family fruit or a hybrid citrus fruit from Orange) is a popular horticultural product; other fruits of the citrus family are also grown.

References

External links 
 Map

Villages in Hanumangarh district